Jason Lydell Glenn (born August 20, 1979) is a former American football linebacker who played in the National Football League (NFL) for the New York Jets, the Miami Dolphins, and the Minnesota Vikings between 2001–2006. He is the younger brother of New York Jets cornerback Aaron Glenn.

Early years
Jason played youth football in the same league his brother Aaron did Humble Area Football League HAFL

High school and college career
Glenn attended Chester W. Nimitz high school in Houston, Texas.

Glenn began his college career at Texas A&M as a safety, but significant increases in size and strength made him better suited for the linebacker position, which he began playing his sophomore year. He was an All-Big 12 Conference first-team selection as a senior in 2000 despite suffering a season-ending knee injury. He finished his college career with 167 tackles (107 solo), 11 sacks, 22 passes deflected and 33 tackles for losses and was one of the Aggies' fan favorites as well as a vocal leader on and off the field.

He was selected a third-team All-American by the Associated Press.

Professional career

Glenn was drafted in the sixth round of the 2001 NFL Draft. Glenn played in the final 15 regular season games of 2001 as rookie with the Jets and finished fifth on the team in special teams tackles with 17. He played in the AFC wild card game at Oakland on 1/12/02 and had one special teams tackle.

Played in all 16 of the 2002 Jets' games. Most of his time was spent on special teams, where he ranked second on the team with 27 tackles, as well as a blocked punt and one fumble recovery. Also had a tackle and a pass deflection in spot duty as an extra LB. Made one tackle on defense and two on special teams in the AFC Wild Card playoff game win over Indianapolis Made two special teams tackles in the AFC Divisional Playoff loss at Oakland.

Played in 14 games in 2003 for Jets and saw his role increase significantly from his first two seasons. Although he was used primarily as the team’s nickel LB, he did start once (game 14 against Pittsburgh) and ended up with 47 tackles on the season.

In 2004, he was limited due to injury—he suffered a fractured right arm against New England and missed six games with the injury. Finished with 10 tackles (seven solo) and a fumble recovery.

Played in all 16 games in 2005 (primarily on special teams) for the Dolphins. Finished the year with 13 tackles (12 solo).

Played primarily on special teams in nine games for the Vikings. He had eight tackles on defense (six solo) and one fumble recovery on special teams before being placed on IR Nov. 14 with an injured knee. Glenn re-aggravated that knee injury during 2007 training camp and was to again be placed on the IR on August 14, 2007. That same day, Vikings' Head Coach Brad Childress announced that Glenn was retiring from football.

Coaching career
Jason was an assistant coach at Pearland High School in Pearland, Texas. The Oilers won the Texas Division 1 5A football title in 2010. In 2011, Jason became head football coach at Chavez High School in Houston,Texas.
In 2012, Glenn was hired as assistant coach at Klein Oak High School, in Spring, Texas. In 2017, he was named the head football coach and athletic director at Klein Oak.

References

External links
Jets bio
Vikings bio
NFL retirement

1979 births
Living people
Sportspeople from Harris County, Texas
Minnesota Vikings players
American football linebackers
New York Jets players
Miami Dolphins players
Texas A&M Aggies football players